The 2019 Judo World Masters was held in Qingdao, China, from 12 to 14 December 2019.

Medal summary

Medal table

 Host nation

Men's events

Women's events

References

External links
 

World Masters
IJF World Masters
World Masters
World Masters
Judo
Judo
Judo